The Württemberg AD was a German steam locomotive built for the Royal Württemberg State Railways. It was an express train engine with a 4-4-0 wheel arrangement and was built from 1899 by the Maschinenfabrik Esslingen ('Esslingen Engineering Works'). Up to that point the railway only had increasingly elderly locomotives with a 2-4-0 configuration.

The vehicles were equipped with a two-cylinder, compound engine. The most striking feature was the large, horizontal pipe connecting the two steam domes. Ninety eight engines of this class were built by 1907; they initially had flat slide valves, but from 1903 piston valves were installed.

In 1907 two locomotives were tested with two-cylinder, superheated steam engines. As a result, 17 more locomotives were built to this configuration up to 1909 and were designated as Class ADh.

Both classes began to be retired in the early 1920s.

The Deutsche Reichsbahn took over 24 of the compound locomotives as DRG Class 13.16 with numbers 13 1601 to 13 1624, and 14 superheated locomotives as DRG Class 13.17 with numbers 13 1701 to 13 1714. The first ones were retired in 1928, the last in 1932.

The locomotives were equipped with Württemberg wü 2 T 10 and wü 3 T 15,5 tenders.

See also
Royal Württemberg State Railways
List of Württemberg locomotives and railbuses

References

4-4-0 locomotives
AD
Esslingen locomotives
Railway locomotives introduced in 1899
Standard gauge locomotives of Germany
Passenger locomotives